The 2000 season was the 88th year of competitive soccer in the United States.

National team

Record

Results
The home team or the team that is designated as the home team is listed in the left column; the away team is

in the right column.

Goalscorers

Major League Soccer

Standings

Top eight teams with the highest points clinch play-off berth, regardless of conference.s =

Supporters Shieldx = Clinched Playoff berth.

Playoffs
Playoff bracket

Points systemWin = 3 Pts.Loss = 0 Pts.Draw = 1 Pt.
ASDET*=Added Sudden Death Extra Time (Game tie breaker)SDET**=Sudden Death Extra Time (Series

tie breaker)Teams will advance at 5 points.

MLS Cup

Lamar Hunt U.S. Open Cup

Bracket
Home teams listed on top of bracket

Final

References
 American competitions at RSSSF
 American national team matches at RSSSF
 CONCACAF Champions' Cup at RSSSF

 
2001